The Zoque are an Indigenous people of Mexico, who are related to the Mixe. They speak various language, also called Zoque, which has several branches and dialects. 

The Zoque consists of 41,609 people, according to the 2000 census. They live mainly in the northerly sector of Chiapas state, principally in the municipios and towns of Amatán, Copainalá, Chapultenango, Francisco León, Ixhuatán, Ixtacomitán, Jitotol, Ocotepec, Ostuacán, Pantepec, Rayón, Totolapa, Tapilula, Tecpatán, Acala, Blanca rosa, and Ocozocoautla. They also live in the northern part of the Isthmus of Tehuantepec, in the state of Oaxaca, including the Selva Zoque. 

In the pre-Hispanic era, the Zoque lived throughout Chiapas, and Isthmus of Tehuantepec and parts of the state of Tabasco. They may have been descendants of the Olmec. They had a good social and commercial relationship with the later Mexica, which contributed to the economic prosperity of their culture in Chiapas. In 1494 during the reign of Ahuizotl, the Aztecs invaded and defeated them, and forced them to pay tribute.

The Spanish conquest of the Zoque lands commenced in 1523, under the leadership of Luis Marin. The Zoque were parceled out among the Spanish settlers, and they endured forced labor and were obliged to pay high tribute. Diseases, exploitation, and the miserable conditions under which they lived contributed to a significant decrease in their numbers.

The situation of the Zoque did not improve with Mexican independence, since they continued to be exploited by the mestizos and criollos. Not until 1922 when they were assigned ejidos (common lands), did their living conditions improve.

History

Pre-colonial period  
In the pre-Hispanic period, the Zoque lived throughout Chiapas, and as far away as the Isthmus of Tehuantepec and parts of the state of Tabasco.

Colonial period 
In 1494, the Zoque were invaded and defeated by the Aztecs, during the reign of Āhuitzotl, and forced to pay tribute.
The Spanish conquest of the Zoque lands commenced in 1523, under the leadership of Luis Marin. The Zoque were parceled out amongst the settlers, where they endured forced labor and were obliged to pay high tribute. Diseases, exploitation and the miserable conditions under which they lived contributed to a significant decrease in their numbers.

Contemporary culture 
White-rimmed black pottery is characteristic of the Zoque people.

The Zoque traditional dress is worn almost exclusively by women and on special occasions. Some elderly men in remote communities wear white cotton shirts. Women traditionally wear short-sleeved white blouses, with colorfully embroidered open necklines, and long poplin skirts in various colors. More recently, they wear knee-length dresses in various bright colors with white lacy trims. Until recently, it was customary for married women to undress the upper half of the body while they worked in the heat. Younger generations of women have become more timid about exposing their breasts.

Their houses are mainly rectangular, with one or two rooms. Traditionally the walls were made of adobe, or mud bricks, whitewashed inside and out, and the houses had earthen floors and roofs consisting of four sloping sides of tile or thatch. More recently, they are constructed with concrete blocks, cemented floors, and corrugated iron roofs. The kitchen is usually a separate structure from the main house.

As with other groups, agriculture is their prime economic activity. The crops vary according to the topography of the terrain. For the most part they raise maize, beans, chiles, and squash. Their commercial crops are coffee, cocoa, peppers,  bananas, mamey, sweetsop, and guava. The soil is of poor quality, and therefore the output is low. They raise pigs and domesticated fowl in small quantities to augment their diet.

The Zoque also work in the construction industry in the cities.

See also  
 Chimalapas territory conflict
 Indigenous people of Oaxaca

References 

This article draws heavily on the corresponding article in the Spanish-language Wikipedia, which was accessed in the version of 19 June 2006.

Indigenous peoples in Mexico
Mesoamerican cultures
Pre-Columbian cultures of Mexico